Harvel is a village in the civil parish of Meopham in the west of the county of Kent, England. It is sited on the southern edge of the North Downs.

The village's name may derive from the names Halifield (Holy Field) or Heorot Field (Hartfield) mentioned in a Saxon charters. A collection of sarsen stones north of the village may be a prehistoric tomb but is more likely a natural group.

On 27 August 1950, Harvel, along with the village of Lenham, was one of the signal receiving points (between Calais and London) of the first-ever live television pictures from the continent.

It has a village green and pond, a cricket team, a village hall, a greyhound rehoming centre and a public house, called The Amazon and Tiger.

References

External links

Villages in Kent